The Tebay rail accident occurred when four railway workers working on the West Coast Main Line were killed by a runaway wagon near Tebay, Cumbria, England in the early hours of 15 February 2004.

Incident
The accident happened after a wagon laden with lengths of steel rail ran away from a maintenance location on the line at Scout Green because it did not have properly working brakes. Wooden chocks had been placed in front of the wagon to stop it moving because the hydraulic brakes had been disconnected due to a fault; however, they had not been repaired or replaced. As a maintenance worker began using an excavator's "log grab" in an attempt to drag sections of scrap rail from the wagon, the action caused the wooden blocks to dislodge. Slowly the wagon began to move downhill gathering momentum on the 1 in 75 gradient from Shap Summit.

Running almost silently and without any warnings, it struck and killed four railway workers who were carrying out overnight work  further down the main line. Five men were also injured. The wagon continued to travel for almost  until stopping.

Memorial

A memorial plaque was erected in September 2006, on a large roughly hewn stone block adjacent to the scene of the incident. It is inscribed with the names of those who were killed.

Aftermath
Following the incident, Mark Connolly, the boss of the rail maintenance company, MAC Machinery Services, and crane operator Roy Kennett, were tried at Newcastle Crown Court on charges of manslaughter caused by gross negligence. Connolly was also prosecuted for breaches of health and safety law. Both men were found guilty by majority verdicts; Connolly was sentenced to nine years imprisonment and Kennett to two years.

On 1 March 2007, an appeal launched by the two jailed men seeking to overturn their convictions failed. However, the Court of Appeal reduced Connolly's prison sentence from nine to seven years.  In January 2017, the Office of the Traffic Commissioner for Wales announced it had rejected an application by Connolly for a Heavy Goods Vehicle Operators' Licence because of his manslaughter convictions. He had made the application to operate HGVs after being found driving a lorry without such a licence in May 2016.

References

Railway accidents and incidents in Cumbria
Runaway train disasters
2004 in England
Railway accidents in 2004
2004 disasters in the United Kingdom
History of Cumbria
2000s in Cumbria
Tebay